The Kosovo national under-20 basketball team is the national under-20 basketball team of Kosovo and is controlled by the Basketball Federation of Kosovo, the governing body for basketball in Kosovo. They have been a member of FIBA since 13 March 2015.

Team

Current roster
The following is the Kosovo roster were called up for the 2021 FIBA Europe Under-20 Challengers.

|}
| style="vertical-align:top;" |
Head coach
 Mark Rodiqi

Legend
Age – describes age,on 18 July 2021
Club – describes lastclub before the competition
|}<noinclude>

References

External links
 

under
Men's national under-20 basketball teams